Rear Admiral Bernhard Hein Teuteberg  is a retired South African naval officer, who served as Chief Director: Maritime Strategy before his retirement.

Military career

He served as Director Maritime Plans, SA Navy Hydrographer and Director Fleet Human Resources from 1999 to 2001, after which he was appointed Director Naval Personnel at the Navy Office.

Awards and decorations

References

South African admirals
Year of birth missing (living people)
Place of birth missing (living people)
Living people